Boreoeutheria ("northern true beasts") is a magnorder of placental mammals that groups together superorders Euarchontoglires and Laurasiatheria. With a few exceptions male animals in the clade have a scrotum, an ancestral feature of the clade. The sub-clade Scrotifera was named after this feature.

Etymology 
The name of this magnorder comes from Ancient Greek words:
  meaning 'north wind' or 'the North',
  meaning 'good', 'right', or 'true',
 and  meaning 'beast'.

Boreoeutherian ancestor 
The majority of earliest known fossils belonging to this group date to about 66 million years ago, shortly after the K-Pg extinction event, though molecular data suggest they may have originated earlier, during the Cretaceous period. This is further supported with fossils of Altacreodus magnus and two species from genus Protungulatum dated about 70.6 million years ago.

The common ancestor of Boreoeutheria lived between 107 and 90 million years ago. The boreoeutherian ancestor gave rise to species as diverse as giraffes, dogs, mice, bats, whales, and humans. The concept of a boreoeutherian ancestor was first proposed in 2004 in the journal Genome Research. The paper's authors claimed that the genome sequence of the boreoeutherian ancestor could be computationally predicted with 98% accuracy, but would "take a few years and a lot of money". It is estimated to contain three billion base pairs.

Classification and phylogeny

Taxonomy 
 Magnorder: Boreoeutheria 
 Superorder: Euarchontoglires 
 Superorder: Laurasiatheria

Phylogeny 
The phylogenetic relationships of magnorder Boreoeutheria are shown in the following cladogram, reconstructed from mitochondrial and nuclear DNA and protein characters, as well as the fossil record.

See also 
 Mammal classification
 Placentalia

Notes

References

Additional references

External links
 
 

 
Extant Maastrichtian first appearances